Ganjam Law College commonly known as GLC is private law institute situated at Bima Nagar, Ambapua Road in Berhampur of Ganjam district in the Indian state of Odisha. It offers 3 years LL.B. courses approved by the Bar Council of India (BCI) and it is affiliated to Berhampur University.

History
Ganjam Law College was established in 1983 by the initiation of academician Late Dr. Nalini Kanta Samanta.

References

Educational institutions established in 1983
1983 establishments in Orissa
Law schools in Odisha
Colleges affiliated to Berhampur University